DEM was the ISO 4217 currency code for the Deutsche Mark, former currency of Germany

Computing 
 Digital elevation model, a digital representation of ground-surface topography or terrain
 .dem, a common extension for USGS DEM files
 Discrete element method or discrete element modeling, a family of numerical methods for computing the motion of a large number of small particles (like molecules or grains of sand)
 Diffuse element method, a numerical simulation method used (for example) to solve partial differential equations
 Display Encode Mode, a feature of the AMD's Video Codec Engine
 Distance Estimation Method, for drawing Julia sets or Mandelbrot sets

Organisations 
 Department of Environmental Management, a name of various government entities
 Democratic Party, short form of the name of the political parties in the world
 Democratic Party (United States)
 Democrats (Brazil)
 Dravske elektrarne Maribor d.o.o., an electric power company in Slovenia
 Day Eight Music, a record label founded by Jonas Hellborg

Other uses 
 Dem language
 Demonstrative case (abbreviated )
 Deus ex machina (Latin; literally "a god from a machine"), a resolution to a story that does not pay due regard to the story's internal logic and that is so unlikely that it challenges suspension of disbelief, and presumably allows the author, director, or developer to end the story in the way that he or she desired
 Diethyl malonate, the diethyl ester of malonic acid
 Dynamic element matching, a technique used in integrated circuits design to compensate for components mismatch